The ulla (hangul: 운라; hanja: 雲鑼 or 雲羅) is a traditional Korean percussion instrument comprising a set of ten small tuned gongs in a wooden frame. The gongs are struck with a beater.

The ulla is derived from the Chinese yunluo.

References

Gongs
Korean musical instruments